Kim Jun-hyun (born 16 November 1980), is a South Korean comedian, signed under JDB Entertainment until 2021.

His religion is Catholicism.

Trivia 
Since 6 May 2020, he is gaining unexpected popularity in the U.S.A. thanks to the broadcast of a South Korean professional baseball (KBO) overseas. During the KBO League Samsung Lions and NC Dinos opening game which was broadcast throughout the United States, his pizza advertisement on the outfield of the stadium received unexpected attention. People showed interest by referring to him as 'Pizza Guy'.

Filmography

Television show

Television series

Films

Awards and nominations

Listicles

References

1980 births
Living people
South Korean male comedians
People from Chuncheon
Hankuk University of Foreign Studies alumni
Gag Concert
Best Variety Performer Male Paeksang Arts Award (television) winners
South Korean Roman Catholics